Richard Appiah Akoto (also nicknamed Owura Kwadwo Hottish), is a Ghanaian educationist at Betenase M/A Junior High School who received attention for his innovative approach for teaching students Information and Communications Technology (ICT) without a computer. A photo he shared of himself on Facebook sketching the features of Microsoft Word on a blackboard to teach students in his class went viral highlighting issues with the Ghanaian educational system.  Since the event, Akoto's school have been given financial and technology support, particularly from Microsoft, and from others around the world. Akoto has spoken at global conferences on the challenges teachers face teaching ICT in the Ghanaian educational system.

Career life 
He is an ICT teacher at Betenase M/A Junior High School in the town of Sekyedomase, which is about two and half hours drive from Kumasi, Ghana. He has been at post in the school for 6 years, and was 33 at the time of the photo. In September 2018, he was given a full scholarship to pursue a master's degree in education with UNICAF University.

Microsoft intervention 

His photo caught the attention of global tech entrepreneur and the CEO of Apps Tech, Rebecca Enonchong who tweeted it to Microsoft after which Microsoft pledged to support his students with computers and enroll him in the Microsoft MCE program. At the Microsoft education exchange organised in Singapore, he was given a standing ovation by hundreds of participant gathered.

Donations 
Donations of laptops started pouring in from Microsoft, individuals and organizations for his school. An IT laboratory was also built for the school.

References 

Ghanaian educators
Living people
Year of birth missing (living people)